KGXX is a radio station airing a country music format licensed to Susanville, California, broadcasting on 100.7 MHz FM.  The station is owned by Independence Rock Media Group, through licensee Independence Rock Media, LLC.

References

External links

Country radio stations in the United States
GXX